The 1987 Western Athletic Conference men's basketball tournament was held March 5–8 at the Pit at the University of New Mexico in Albuquerque, New Mexico.

Wyoming defeated tournament hosts  in the championship game, 64–62, to clinch their first WAC men's tournament championship.

The Cowboys, in turn, received an automatic bid to the 1987 NCAA tournament. The tournament's top two seeds, UTEP and BYU, also earned at-large bids to the tournament.

Format
The tournament field remained fixed at nine teams, and teams were again seeded based on regular season conference records. All teams were entered into the quarterfinal round with the exception of the two lowest-seeded teams, who played in the preliminary first round to determine who would then play against the tournament's top seed.

Bracket

References

WAC men's basketball tournament
Tournament
WAC men's basketball tournament
WAC men's basketball tournament